Stephen De Lancey (December 1738 – May 1809) was a lawyer and political figure in New York state and Nova Scotia. He represented Annapolis Township in the Nova Scotia House of Assembly from 1784 to 1789.

Early life

He was born in West Farms, New York, the eldest son of Peter DeLancey (1705–1770) and Elizabeth (née Colden) DeLancey. His sister, Susan DeLancey (1754–1837), was married to Thomas Henry Barclay (1753–1830), a lawyer who became one of the United Empire Loyalists in Nova Scotia and served in the colony's government.

His paternal grandparents were Etienne de Lancey and Anne van Cortlandt (1676–1724), herself the third child of Gertrude Schuyler (born 1654) and Stephanus van Cortlandt (1643–1700), the Chief Justice of the Province of New York.  Both his uncle, James DeLancey (1703–1760), and maternal grandfather, Cadwallader Colden (1688–1776), served as Colonial Governors of New York.

Career
He studied law and later moved to Albany.  From 1765 to 1766, he served as clerk for the city and county of Albany.  In 1770, he was named a masters in the provincial chancery court. He was elected to the Albany committee of correspondence in 1775.

Nova Scotia
In 1776, because of his loyalist sympathies, he was stripped of his posts and deported to Hartford, Connecticut.  In 1783, he moved to Nova Scotia with his family. He was first elected to the provincial assembly in a by-election held in 1783, taking the seat on Nov. 16, 1784, and was elected again in 1785. There is a website claiming that in 1786, he was named to the province's Council, however he does not appear in a list of their members.  A more reliable source reports that he was appointed to office in the Bahamas, and his seat was declared vacant April 6, 1789. His brother James won a by-election to replace him in the provincial assembly, and he took the seat on Feb. 26, 1790. James was indeed named a member of the Council on June 6, 1794, and this may be the source of confusion.

Personal life
De Lancey was married to Esther Rynderts of Albany. Together, they were the parents of three children:

 Elizabeth De Lancey
 Mary De Lancey
 Cadwallader De Lancey

De Lancey died in Annapolis at the age of 70.

References 

1738 births
1809 deaths
Canadian people of Dutch descent
Schuyler family
Nova Scotia pre-Confederation MLAs
People of the Province of New York
People from the Bronx
Loyalists in the American Revolution from New York (state)
Loyalists who settled Nova Scotia
De Lancey family